Dany Gonçalves (born 14 March 1985) is a Portuguese sprinter. He represented his country in the 4 × 100 metres relay at the 2009 World Championships without qualifying for the final.

International competitions

Personal bests

Outdoor
100 metres – 10.39 (+1.4 m/s, Leiria 2009)
200 metres – 21.44 (Lisbon 2012)
Indoor
60 metres – 6.81 (Pombal 2009)
200 metres – 21.48 (Pombal 2009)

References

1985 births
Living people
Portuguese male sprinters
Madeiran sportspeople
S.L. Benfica athletes
Competitors at the 2009 Summer Universiade